Klaus Berge (born 4 October 1961) is a former German football player and current manager who last managed DSC Wanne-Eickel.

As player he most notably played for FC Schalke 04 and 1. FC Saarbrücken.

In 1997, he started his managerial career at LR Ahlen. In March 2008 he replaced Aleksandar Ristić in KFC Uerdingen 05 with the goal of saving the club from relegation. He did not succeed and left the club because he got a better offer at Schwarz-Weiß Essen.

References

1961 births
Living people
German footballers
German football managers
Bundesliga players
2. Bundesliga players
FC Schalke 04 players
1. FC Saarbrücken players
Rot Weiss Ahlen managers
Rot-Weiss Essen managers
KFC Uerdingen 05 managers
Schwarz-Weiß Essen managers
SC Preußen Münster managers
Association football midfielders
DSC Wanne-Eickel managers
People from Recklinghausen
Sportspeople from Münster (region)
Footballers from North Rhine-Westphalia
20th-century German people
West German footballers